Butterdon Hill is on Dartmoor, in southwest England. The remains of a small stone circle and a stone row can be found on the summit. The name Butterdon is believed to derive an Old English word for "pasture".

References

Dartmoor
Hills of Devon